Jack Kornfield (born 1945) is an American writer and teacher in the Vipassana movement in American Theravada Buddhism. He trained as a Buddhist monk in Thailand, Burma and India, first as a student of the Thai forest master Ajahn Chah and Mahasi Sayadaw of Burma. He has taught mindfulness meditation worldwide since 1974. In 1975, he co-founded the Insight Meditation Society in Barre, Massachusetts, with Sharon Salzberg and Joseph Goldstein, and subsequently in 1987, Spirit Rock Meditation Center in Woodacre, California. Kornfield has worked as a peacemaker and activist, organized teacher trainings, and led international gatherings of Buddhist teachers including the Dalai Lama.

Biography 
Kornfield is of Jewish descent and has four brothers.  He is a fraternal twin. His father was a scientist, which brought him to an interest in healing, medicine and science. He took a course in Asian philosophy with Dr. Wing-tsit Chan. Kornfield ended up majoring in Asian studies.

After graduating from Dartmouth College in 1967, Kornfield joined the Peace Corps and was sent to Thailand where he worked on tropical medicine teams in the Mekong River valley. There he met and became a monk under the forest master Ajahn Chah, and later practiced with Mahasi Sayadaw of Burma and Dipa Ma. Kornfield returned to the United States in 1972 and in the summer of 1974, participated in the founding session of Naropa University. From the associations of this period came the Insight Meditation Society co-founded in 1975 with Sharon Salzberg and Joseph Goldstein in Barre, Massachusetts. In 1987 he co-founded Spirit Rock Meditation Center in Woodacre, California.

Kornfield has trained many of the Vipassana teachers in America, and hosted and led gatherings for Buddhist teachers together with the Dalai Lama and worldwide. He received his Ph.D. in clinical psychology from Saybrook Institute. Kornfield has written extensively on the bridge between Eastern and Western psychology.

His daughter Caroline is a graduate of Berkeley Law and practices Asylum Law.  His ex-wife Liana is an artist and therapist. His wife Trudy Goodman is also a renowned meditation teacher and the founding teacher of InsightLA, which combines training in Vipassana and non-sectarian mindfulness and compassion practices, including Mindfulness-Based Stress Reduction (MBSR) and Mindful Self-Compassion (MSC).

Teachings 

Kornfield has worked to make Buddhism accessible for Westerners.  He has focused on combining loving kindness and self compassion with the practice of mindfulness, and incorporating together the wisdom of Eastern and Western psychology.

In Jack Kornfield's book After the Ecstasy, the Laundry, he writes about the honest development of the wise heart within the cycles of day-to-day life; for instance "amid all the Western masters and teachers I know, some idealistic perfection is not apparent. Times of great wisdom, deep compassion, and a real knowing of freedom alternate with periods of fear, confusion, neurosis, and struggle. Most teachers will readily admit this."

Kornfield lectures were featured by Joe Frank on his radio series "The Other Side."

Books published 
His books include:
* 
* 
* 
* 
* 
* 
* 
* 
* 
* 
* 
* 
* 
* 
*

References

External links 
 
 Jack Kornfield audio  from the DIY Dharma website
 The Eightfold Path for the Householder from the Urban Dharma website

1945 births
Living people
20th-century American male writers
20th-century American non-fiction writers
21st-century American male writers
21st-century American non-fiction writers
American male non-fiction writers
American spiritual writers
American Theravada Buddhists
Converts to Buddhism
Dartmouth College alumni
Jewish American writers
People from Woodacre, California
Students of Dipa Ma
Students of Mahasi Sayadaw
Theravada Buddhism writers
Writers from California